Soľník is a village and municipality in Stropkov District in the Prešov Region of north-eastern Slovakia.

History
In historical records the village was first mentioned in 1454.

Geography
The municipality lies at an altitude of 284 metres and covers an area of 4.401 km2. It has a population of about 44 people.

References

External links
 
http://www.statistics.sk/mosmis/eng/run.html

Villages and municipalities in Stropkov District